Isaac Roberts Hawkins (May 16, 1818 – August 12, 1880) was an American soldier, politician and a member of the United States House of Representatives for Tennessee's 7th congressional district.

Biography
Hawkins was born on May 16, 1818 near Columbia, Tennessee in Maury County, to Samuel and Nancy Roberts Hawkins. Nancy was the daughter of Gen. Isaac Roberts and his wife Mary "Polly" Johnston Roberts and was the maternal granddaughter of Ann Robertson Johnston Cockrill, an early pioneer who was sister to James Robertson, a founder of Ft Nashborough (later Nashville). Samuel Hawkins' mother was Cassandra Roberts (Isaac Roberts' sister), which made Samuel and Nancy first cousins as well as spouses-not an uncommon practice at that time. Isaac moved with his parents to Carroll County in 1828 and attended the common schools. They lived on land that was part of a 1790 North Carolina land grant received by Gen. Roberts. Isaac engaged in agricultural pursuits, studied law, and was admitted to the bar in 1843. He commenced practice in Huntingdon, Tennessee in Carroll County. He was married to Ellen Ott whose sister Justina married Isaac's first cousin Alvin, who later served as governor of Tennessee.

Career
Having served as a lieutenant during the Mexican–American War, Hawkins then resumed the practice of law. A staunch Unionist, he was a delegate from Tennessee to a peace conference held in Washington, D.C., in 1861 in an effort to devise a means to prevent the impending war. He was elected to the convention for the consideration of Federal relations. He was judge of the circuit court in 1862. He entered the Union Army as lieutenant colonel of the 7th Tennessee Volunteer Cavalry in 1862. He was captured with his regiment at Union City, Tennessee in 1864 and imprisoned. He was exchanged in August 1864 and resumed active service, being in command of the Cavalry force in western Kentucky until the close of the Civil War. He was commissioned by Governor William Gannaway Brownlow as one of the chancellors of Tennessee in 1865 but declined to qualify.

Hawkins was a delegate to the Republican National Convention in 1868. Upon the readmission of Tennessee to representation, he was elected as a Unionist to the Thirty-ninth Congress and re-elected as a Republican to the Fortieth and Forty-first Congresses. He served from December 4, 1865 to March 3, 1871. During the Forty-first Congress, he was the chairman of the United States House Committee on Mileage.

Death
Hawkins died in Huntingdon, Tennessee on August 12, 1880 (age 62 years, 88 days). He is interred at the Hawkins family burial ground near Huntingdon.

References

External links

 
 Hawkins' Tories: A Regimental and Social History of the 7th Tennessee Volunteer Cavalry USA

1818 births
1880 deaths
People from Maury County, Tennessee
Tennessee Unionists
Unionist Party members of the United States House of Representatives from Tennessee
Republican Party members of the United States House of Representatives from Tennessee
Tennessee lawyers
American military personnel of the Mexican–American War
Union Army officers
People of Tennessee in the American Civil War
19th-century American politicians
People from Huntingdon, Tennessee
19th-century American lawyers